The Naked Angel (Spanish:El ángel desnudo) is a 1946 Argentine drama film directed by Carlos Hugo Christensen and starring Olga Zubarry, Guillermo Battaglia and Carlos Cores. The film is based on the novella Fräulein Else by Arthur Schnitzler. The director, Christensen, had gained a reputation for exploring more sexual themes in his films than was traditional in Argentine cinema at the time.

In a survey of the 100 greatest films of Argentine cinema carried out by the Museo del Cine Pablo Ducrós Hicken in 2000, the film reached the 35th position.

Synopsis

A sculptor agrees to lend a bankrupt man money provided his beautiful daughter pose nude for his latest work of art.

Cast
 Olga Zubarry as Elsa Las Heras
 Guillermo Battaglia as Guillermo Lagos Renard
 Carlos Cores as Mario
 Eduardo Cuitiño as Gaspar Las Heras
 Ángel Orrequia as Vargas
 Fedel Despres as Diana
 Cirilo Etulain as Morales
 José de Ángelis as Prefecto
 Orestes Soriani as Presidente Sociedad Críticos de Arte
 Cecilio de Vega as ubois
 José De Ángelis

References

Bibliography 
 Rist, Peter H. Historical Dictionary of South American Cinema. Rowman & Littlefield, 2014.

External links 

1946 films
Argentine drama films
1946 drama films
1940s Spanish-language films
Films directed by Carlos Hugo Christensen
Films based on short fiction
Argentine black-and-white films
1940s Argentine films